Christ Lutheran Church may refer to:

India
 Christ Lutheran Church, Narsapur, Andhra Pradesh
 Christ Lutheran Church Kattukadai, Tamil Nadu

United States
 Christ Evangelical Lutheran Church, in Milwaukee, Wisconsin
 Christ Lutheran Church (Ellenville, New York)
 Christ Lutheran Church (New York City)

See also
 Cross of Christ Lutheran Church, Welch Township, Minnesota